Arbrå is the second largest locality in Bollnäs Municipality, Gävleborg County, Sweden with 2,215 inhabitants in 2010.

Points of interest 
 Arbråmasten, a 331 metres tall guyed TV mast.

Notable people 
Gösta "Snoddas" Nordgren, singer and bandy player, was born in Arbrå on 30 December 1926.
Peter Stormare, actor, grew up in Arbrå.

Sports
The following sports clubs are located in Arbrå:

 Arbrå BK

References

External links

Populated places in Bollnäs Municipality
Hälsingland